Kurt Ehrle (26 May 1884 – 17 April 1967) was a German stage and film actor.

Selected filmography
 Put to the Test (1918)
 Agnes Arnau and Her Three Suitors (1918)
 Baccarat (1919)
 Satan (1920)
 The Woman Without a Soul (1920)
 Mascotte (1920)
 The Skull of Pharaoh's Daughter (1920)
 The Demon of Kolno (1921)
 The Sins of the Mother (1921)
 Sodom and Gomorrah (1922)
 Does a Woman Have to Become a Mother? (1924)
 The Duke of Reichstadt (1931)
 A Woman Branded (1931)

References

Bibliography 
 William B. Parrill. European Silent Films on Video: A Critical Guide. McFarland, 2006.

External links 
 

1884 births
1967 deaths
German male film actors
German male silent film actors
20th-century German male actors
German male stage actors
People from Leutkirch im Allgäu